is a Japanese baseball pitcher from Moriguchi, Osaka, Japan and he currently plays for the Hanshin Tigers.  He was a member of the Japan team in the 2009 World Baseball Classic.

Early years
Iwata entered Osaka Toin High School in 1998. He became the ace pitcher in autumn 1999 (his 2nd year of senior high school) and contributed to the school's winning the Osaka High School Baseball Autumn Tournament and advancing to the quarterfinal in the Kansai High School Baseball Autumn Tournament. However, he contracted type 1 diabetes in the winter of his second year. At the time of his diagnosis he had an agreement to join a successful company team after graduation, however the agreement was withdrawn after the company learned of his illness. His treating doctor allowed him to continue playing baseball as part of a balanced lifestyle necessary to stabilize the symptoms of diabetes. After graduating high school he entered Kansai University in 2001, where he was the school team's ace pitcher. He had 6 wins and 10 losses in the university league.

Nippon Professional Baseball
He was drafted by the Hanshin Tigers after 2005 season because of his various breaking balls. In his debut in 2006, Iwata allowed four runs in 3 innings of work and lost his only game in the season. In 2007, Iwata was 0-1 and a 5.40 ERA. In 2008, he was third in voting for the 2008 Central League Rookie of the Year Award, trailing Tetsuya Yamaguchi and Hayato Sakamoto after going 10-10 with a 3.28 ERA and 101 strikeouts.

Iwata missed the 2010 season. The following season, he had a 9-13 record, a 2.29 ERA, and 133 strikeouts in 25 starts.

2009 World Baseball Classic
He was selected to play for Japan in the 2009 World Baseball Classic replacing Hiroki Kuroda due to his shoulder problems.

References

External links

1983 births
Living people
People from Moriguchi, Osaka
Baseball people from Osaka Prefecture
Japanese baseball players
Nippon Professional Baseball pitchers
Hanshin Tigers players
2009 World Baseball Classic players
Kansai University alumni